Rat-tailed maggots are the larvae of certain species of hoverflies belonging to the tribes Eristalini and Sericomyiini. A characteristic feature of rat-tailed maggots is a tube-like, telescoping breathing siphon located at its posterior end. This acts like a snorkel, allowing the larva to breathe air while submerged. This organ gives the larva its common name.

The most commonly encountered rat-tailed maggot is the larva of the drone fly, Eristalis tenax. It lives in stagnant, oxygen-deprived water, with a high organic content. It is fairly tolerant of pollution and can live in sewage lagoons and cesspools.

Commercial use
These larvae, commonly called "mousies", are cultured and sold as fish bait. They are especially popular in ice fishing.

Infection
Occasionally, cases have been documented of human intestinal myiasis caused by the rat-tailed maggot. Symptoms can range from none (asymptomatic) to abdominal pain, nausea and vomiting, or pruritus ani. Infection can be caused by ingestion of contaminated food or water, but doubts have been expressed that accidentally ingested fly larvae could survive in the gastrointestinal tract. Zumpt proposed an alternative  called "rectal myiasis".  Flies, attracted to feces, may deposit their eggs or larvae near or into the anus, and the larvae then penetrate further into the rectum. They can survive feeding on feces at this site, as long as the breathing tube reaches towards the anus.

Gallery

References

External links

 Rat-tailed maggot on the UF / IFAS Featured Creatures Web site

Hoverflies
Aquatic insects
Insect common names